Katja Seizinger (born 10 May 1972) is a former World Cup alpine ski racing champion, Germany's most successful alpine skier.

Biography

Born in Datteln, North Rhine-Westphalia, Seizinger won three Olympic gold and two bronze medals, and won eleven World Cup season titles: two overall, four downhill, and five Super-G.  She was a three-time winner of Germany's sportswoman of the year award.

With Olympic downhill victories in 1994 and 1998, she was the first to win consecutive Olympic gold medals in the same alpine speed event, and also the first woman to successfully defend an Olympic alpine title.

Seizinger injured both knees while training in June 1998, missed the entire 1999 season, then retired in April.

World Cup results

Season standings

Season titles
 11 titles – (2 overall, 4 DH, 5 SG)

Race victories
 36 wins – (16 DH, 16 SG, 4 GS)

World Championship results

Olympic results

See also
List of FIS Alpine Ski World Cup women's race winners

References

External links
 
 

1972 births
Living people
People from Datteln
Sportspeople from Münster (region)
German female alpine skiers
Alpine skiers at the 1992 Winter Olympics
Alpine skiers at the 1994 Winter Olympics
Alpine skiers at the 1998 Winter Olympics
Olympic gold medalists for Germany
Olympic bronze medalists for Germany
Olympic medalists in alpine skiing
FIS Alpine Ski World Cup champions
Medalists at the 1998 Winter Olympics
Medalists at the 1994 Winter Olympics
Medalists at the 1992 Winter Olympics
Olympic alpine skiers of Germany
Recipients of the Order of Merit of Baden-Württemberg
20th-century German women